Ringed dove may refer to:
 Columba palumbus, the common wood pigeon
 Streptopelia decaocto, the Eurasian collared dove

See also
 Barbary dove
 Ring-necked dove
 genus Streptopelia

Animal common name disambiguation pages